The Bright Sparklers Fireworks fire occurred in Sungai Buloh, Selangor, Malaysia on 7 May 1991. The Bright Sparklers Fireworks factory in Sungai Buloh, Selangor caught fire and caused a huge explosion. Twenty six people were killed and over a hundred people were injured in the disaster. The explosion was strong enough to rip the roofs of some local houses, and ended up damaging over 200 residential properties.

Cause
The tragedy is believed to have been caused by explosive chemicals spilled during an experiment in the canteen of the factory. The chemicals touched off fires that rapidly spread to a nearby pile of large firecrackers, known as the "bazookas".  These in turn set off the chain of explosions that ripped apart the factory and the nearby buildings, including the factory and nearby Kampung Baru Sungai Buloh.

Victims
26 people were killed and 83 people were injured. Victims were taken to the Kuala Lumpur Hospital for further treatments.

Memorial
A small memorial in the design of a Chinese pavilion was erected at the site in 1998. Underneath it are three memorial stones, each written in Malay, Chinese and Tamil. 

The site is near the Kampung Selamat MRT station.

In popular culture
TV3's documentary programme, Detik Tragik (Tragic Moments) produced an episode about the fireworks disaster.

See also
 1991 Culemborg, Netherlands fireworks disaster - occurred around 3-4 months before the Bright Sparklers disaster
 2000 Enschede, Netherlands fireworks disaster, a similar incident
 2004 Kolding, Denmark  fireworks disaster, a similar incident  
 2015 Tianjin explosions
 2017 Tangerang, Indonesia fireworks disaster, happened in the neighbouring country of Indonesia
 2020 Port of Beirut disaster
 List of fires
 List of industrial disasters

References

1991 in Malaysia
Explosions in 1991
Fireworks accidents and incidents
Industrial fires and explosions
1991 fires in Asia
1991 industrial disasters
May 1991 events in Asia
Explosions in Malaysia
1991 disasters in Malaysia